Emika is a populated place situated in Pima County, Arizona, United States. The name comes from the O'odham language, meaning "my clearing".

References

Populated places in Pima County, Arizona